Mabel Bert (née Scott, 1862 – ?) was an Australian-born American actress.

Early life
Bert was born in Australia in 1862. Her father was A.C. Scott whose family was very wealthy. They immigrated to the United States in 1865, settling in San Francisco, California to allow Mabel better schooling. She was educated in Mills Seminary in Oakland, California.

Career

Mabel was an actress, known for Straight Is the Way (1921), The Wonderful Thing (1921) and Blackbirds (1920).

She started as an actress by chance.  She was behind the scenes with a friend during the performance of Oliver Twist and was asked at the last minute to replace a missing actress who had three lines.

At the beginning of her career, she played with various companies throughout California for two years and in 1886 joined a stock company in San Francisco for leading parts. For 14 months she took a new part every week, including Shakespeare's plays, old comedies, melodramas, society plays and burlesques. In 1887, she went east and joined one of Frohman Brothers' companies in Held by the Enemy. Since that time, Bert took leading parts in various plays and appeared in all of the important cities of the U.S. She played leads for the John A. Stevens Company at the old Grand Opera House, San Francisco.

Personal life

She left school when she was 17 years old, and on 25 May 1879, she married Edward G. Bert, theatrical manager working for his brother, Fred Bert, a pioneer theater man of Oakland. She made her debut on the stage in 1880.

In 1887, she began a relationship with Arthur McKee Rankin (known as McKee Rankin) and became pregnant. She gave birth to a baby girl, Doris Rankin, who later married Lionel Barrymore, Bert's costar in Arizona. In 1888 her husband filed for divorce on the ground of desertion. In 1892, Rankin's wife filed for divorce, but Rankin, a devoted Catholic, did not marry Bert. Rankin already had two daughters (Gladys and Phyllis) from his marriage to Kitty Blanchard.

On 28 July 1893, Bert married Forrest Robinson, who was an actor from Broadway and later starred in films of Mary Pickford. They met when performing together in The Lost Paradise.

After becoming a widow in 1924, she lived with her daughter in Denver in the 1930s.

Works

 Stage Play 1925: Accused as Mme. De Verron
 Movie 1921: The Wonderful Thing as Lady Sophia Alexandria Mannerby
 Movie 1921: Straight Is the Way as Aunt Mehitabel
 Movie 1920: Blackbirds
 Stage Play 1918: Turn to the Right
 Stage Play 1915: Daddy Long Legs
 Stage Play 1914: Young Wisdom as Mrs. Claffenden: "The girls' mother played splendidly by Mabel Bert."
 Stage Play 1912: The Senator Keeps House as Mrs Ida Flower: "Miss Mabel Bert played the part of Mrs. Ida Flower with great skill, delicacy and charm."
 Stege Play 1911: Sire as Mlle de Saint-Salbi: "One of the most sympathetic and charming character portrayals that has been seen on the Pittsburgh stage in a long time."
 Stage Play 1911: What the Doctor Ordered
 Stage Play 1910: The Faith Healer
 Stage Play 1909: Ragged Robin
 Stage Play 1906: The Crossing as Mrs. Temple: "The finished acting of Miss Mabel Bert saved it from exceeding tameness"
 Stage Play 1906: The Light Eternal
 Stage Play 1906: The Price of Money
 Broadway 1899-1900-1901-1903-1905: Ben Hur as Mother of Hur
 Stage Play 1899: Arizona as Estrella Bonham
 Stage Play 1898: The Master as Mrs. Thomas Faber: "Mabel Bert as the wife of the stern "Master" cannot well be too much praised for her earnest and natural performances."
 Stage Play 1896: The Liar as Elaine Rousseau
 Stage Play 1894: The Lost Paradise: "Among the actors and actresses who made up the stock company and the Bijou last summer, none were more genuinely appreciated than young Forrest Robinson and Mabel Bert."
 Stage Play 1892: Little Tippett
 Stage Play 1891: The Canuck as Angelique Bisquitte
 Stage Play 1890: The Fatal Card
 Stage Play 1890: Shenandoah
 Stage Play 1890: The Masqueraders
 Stage Play 1889: Hearts-Ease as Lady Neville
 Stage Play 1889: Undine
 Stage Play 1889: Hazel Kirk
 Stage Play 1889: Convict 1240
 Stage Play 1889: The Silver King
 Stage Play 1889: The Kantuck
 Stage Play 1888-1889: The Runaway Wife
 Stage Play 1888: The New Danites as Miss Dido
 Stage Play 1887: Allan Dare
 Stage Play 1887: Wife and Child as Lady Alice
 Stage Play 1886: 49 as Carrots
 Stage Play 1886: The Last Days of Pompeii
 Stage Play 1886: Under the Polar Star
 Stage Play 1886: Falsely Accused, or, The Deadwood Stage as Pix
 Stage Play 1886: The Two Orphans as Louise
 Stage Play 1886: The Golden Giant as Ethel Wayne and later as Bessie Fairfax
 Stage Play 1886: Everybody's Friend as Mrs Featherly
 Stage Play 1886: The Field of the Cloth of Gold
 Stage Play 1886: Rob Roy
 Stage Play 1886: Guy Mannering as Julia Mannering
 Stage Play 1886: Erin O'Chorra as Norah Delaney
 Stage Play 1886: Money as Clara Douglas
 Stage Play 1886: Second Sight
 Stage Play 1886: Hoodman Blind
 Stage Play 1886: Notre Dame as Esmeralda
 Stage Play 1886: The Danites as Widder and later as Billy Piper: "A young lady of great talent as an actress, and of extreme beauty"
 Stage Play 1885: A Wall Street Bandit
 Stage Play 1885: Macbeth as Lady Macduff and later as Lady Macbeth
 Stage Play 1885: Brought to Justice as Nell Forrest
 Stage Play 1882: Step by Step as Shop Girl
 Stage Play 1882: A Prisoner for Life (debut)

External links
Mabel Bert portraits (University of Louisville, Macauley Theatre collection)

References

1862 births
American stage actresses
Australian stage actresses
American film actresses
Australian film actresses
American silent film actresses
20th-century American actresses
Australian silent film actresses
20th-century Australian actresses
Australian emigrants to the United States
Year of death missing
Wikipedia articles incorporating text from A Woman of the Century